Mary Moser   (27 October 1744 – 2 May 1819) was an English painter and one of the most celebrated female artists of 18th-century Britain. One of only two female founding members of the Royal Academy in 1768 (along with Angelica Kauffman), Moser painted portraits but is particularly noted for her depictions of flowers.

Life and career
London-born Moser was trained by her Swiss-born artist and enameller father George Michael Moser (1706–1783), George III's own drawing master. Her talents were evident at an early age: she won her first Society of Arts medal at 14, and regularly exhibited flower pieces, and occasional history paintings, at the Society of Artists of Great Britain. Ten years later, however, her thirst for professional recognition led her to join with 35 other artists (including her father) in forming the Royal Academy, and, with Angelica Kauffman, she took an active role in proceedings.

In a group portrait by Johan Zoffany, The Academicians of the Royal Academy (1771–72; Royal Collection, London), members are shown gathered around a nude male model at a time when women were excluded from such training in order to protect their modesty. So that Moser and Kauffman could be included, Zoffany added them as portraits hanging on the wall.

George Romney (c. 1770) painted a portrait of Moser at work on a still life which was acquired by the National Portrait Gallery (London) in 2003.

Her influences include the older Dutch masters, famed for glowing color against dark backgrounds. From the beginning, her approach was "bold and luxurious," writes Germaine Greer.

In the 1790s, Moser received a prestigious commission, for which she was paid over £900, from Queen Charlotte to complete a floral decorative scheme for a room in Frogmore House in Windsor, Berkshire.
This was to prove one of her last professional works. At 53, she married Captain Hugh Lloyd, the widower of a friend on 23 October 1793. She retired and began exhibiting as an amateur under her married name. She continued showing at the Royal Academy until 1802.

At this period Moser had a brief affair with artist Richard Cosway, who was then separated from his wife Maria Cosway, an Anglo-Italian artist. Moser travelled with him for six months on a sketching tour in 1793.

"One of the most celebrated women artists of 18th-century Britain," Moser died in Upper Thornhaugh Street, London, on 2 May 1819, and was buried, alongside her husband in Kensington Cemetery.

Moser's pieces in the British Royal Collection show that she was not only "the first significant British flower painter, she was also one of the best." Her portrait of famed British sculptor Joseph Nollekens hangs in the Yale Center for British Art.

Legacy
After Moser's death in 1819, no further women were elected as full members of the Academy until Dame Laura Knight in 1936.

References

Further reading 
 de Bray, Lys (2001). The Art of Botanical Illustration: A history of classic illustrators and their achievements, p. 72. Quantum Publishing Ltd., London. .
Paris Spies-Gans, “Mary Moser: Portraitist,” Journal18 Issue 8 Self/Portrait (Fall 2019), https://www.journal18.org/4228.

External links
 
Info and pictures from the National Portrait Gallery

1744 births
1819 deaths
Royal Academicians
English women painters
British women illustrators
Flower artists
Painters from London